Syon can mean:

 an alternative spelling of Zion
 Syon, Isleworth, London, England
 Syon Abbey, or simply Syon, a 15th–16th century monastery
Syon House
Syon Park

See also

Syon Lane (disambiguation)
Syon Lane railway station
Scion (disambiguation)
Zion (disambiguation)
Songs of Syon, a 1904 collection of hymns and sacred poems